Aisle (known as Lunapads from 1993 to 2019) is a business in Vancouver, British Columbia, Canada that manufactures washable feminine hygiene products, including cloth menstrual pads, period underwear, and menstrual cups.

Overview

History
The products were designed and created by fashion designer Madeleine Shaw in 1993. Shaw wrote the first business plan for Lunapads in 1994, and in 1995 opened a store and small production facility. In 1999 Lunapads was co-founded with Suzanne Siemens, an accountant that Shaw met at a community leadership course. The companies mission was "to create a more positive and informed relationship between woman and their bodies and the Earth".

Lunapads mentored AFRIpads, a project started to help resolve the issue of girls in developing nations missing school due to a lack of adequate sanitary protection and resources available to manage their periods.

In 2020, Lunapads rebranded as Aisle.

Description
Lunapads were a liner-on-top style cloth menstrual pad as opposed to the more common "envelope" style. The pads have two parts; a Pad Base which snaps around the underwear of the wearer and a Liner Insert which is inserted under two bands on either end of the pad. Each pad consists of two layers of cotton flannel base topped with a central pad made of one layer of nylon and two layers of cotton fleece with bands at either end to hold liners. This product was discontinued in 2020, and replaced with a design using technical cotton.

Luna Undies were period underwear, designed to function on their own as a menstrual product. A nine-inch long panel of cotton fleece is sewn permanently into the gusset, with cotton bands at each end to hold liner inserts. Luna Undies are most frequently considered a menstrual product, but are also worn as maternity underwear (prenatal and post-partum), and used by those who experience light or stress incontinence. This product was discontinued in 2020, and replaced with Aisle Undies.

See also
 Cloth menstrual pad
 Menstrual cup
 Menstrual cycle

References

Additional sources

External links
 Official website
 Chatelaine: Your Greenest Time of the Month. Period.
 Founding Canadian B Corporation: Aisle
 Media Planet: Addressing a Monthly Issue
 Aisle CEO, Suzanne Siemens, on the Importance of Listening to Customers

Feminine hygiene brands